The cheerleader effect, also known as the group attractiveness effect, is a proposed cognitive bias which causes people to think individuals are more attractive when they are in a group. The term was backed up by research by Drew Walker and Edward Vul (2013) and van Osch et al. (2015).

Media 
The phrase was coined by the fictional character Barney Stinson (Neil Patrick Harris) in "Not a Father's Day", an episode of the television series How I Met Your Mother, first aired in November 2008. Barney points out to his friends a group of women that initially seem attractive, but who are all unattractive when examined individually. This point is made again by two other characters, Ted Mosby (Josh Radnor) and Robin Scherbatsky (Cobie Smulders), later in the episode, who note that some of Barney's friends also only seem attractive in a group.

Studies

2013 study
Across five studies by Walker and Vul (2013), participants rated the attractiveness of male and female faces when shown in a group photo, and an individual photo, with the order of the photographs randomised. The people photographed got higher scores for their group photos.

This effect occurs with male-only, female-only and mixed gender groups, and both small and large groups. The effect occurs to the same extent with groups of four and 16 people. Participants in studies looked more at the attractive people than the unattractive people in the group. The effect does not occur because group photos give the impression that individuals have more social or emotional intelligence: this was shown to be the case by a study which used individual photos grouped together in a single image, rather than photos taken of people in a group.

Proposed explanation
Drew Walker and Edward Vul proposed that this effect arises due to the interplay of three cognitive phenomena:
The human visual system takes "ensemble representations" of faces in a group.
Perception of individuals is biased towards this average.
Average faces are more attractive, perhaps due to "averaging out of unattractive idiosyncracies".
When all three of these phenomena are taken together, the individual faces will seem more attractive in a group, as they appear more similar to the average group face, which is more attractive than members' individual faces.

2015 study
A 2015 study by van Osch et al. confirmed the results obtained by Walker and Vul.

Proposed explanation
The research team offered two different explanations for the group attractiveness effect:
Selective attention to attractive group members.
The Gestalt principle of similarity.
They claim that selective attention fits better the gathered data.

Replication failure
A 2015 replication of Walker and Vul's study failed to show any significant results for the group attractiveness effect. The research team hypothesized that this may be due to cultural differences, since the replication study was performed in Japan.

References

Further reading
 Article on Walker and Vul's 2013 study.

Cognitive biases
Crowd psychology